Berkhof, Berkhoff or Berkoff may refer to:

Berkoff (surname), a surname of Eastern European origin
Berkhof or Berkhoff, a surname of Dutch and German origin
VDL Berkhof, a Dutch manufacturer of buses
, a town in Wedemark, Lower Saxony, Germany

See also
Berghof (disambiguation) (includes Berghoff)